Wesley Amos Livengood (July 18, 1910 – September 2, 1996) was an American professional baseball player, scout and manager, including some time spent as a minor league player-manager.

Livengood attended Duke University and entered pro ball in 1932. He then spent 1933–36 out of organized baseball before returning to the minor leagues in 1937. Livengood broke into the big leagues with the Cincinnati Reds in 1939. He pitched a total of 5 innings for Cincinnati over five games as a reliever during the Reds' pennant-winning 1939 season.

He returned to the minors making stops in Knoxville, Durham, Portsmouth, and Milwaukee. He served in the Navy for two years during World War II where, among other things, he played baseball at Pearl Harbor.

After the war Livengood played more minor league ball through the 1952 season and sometimes served as the a player-manager, as he did for Kinston in 1951.

His best year was in 1938 when he went 21–9 with an ERA of 3.06 for the Class D Bassett Furnituremakers. Another outstanding campaign was 1943 when he went 18–10 for Milwaukee.

After his playing days were over, he managed in the minors and scouted for the  Philadelphia Phillies for thirty years, where he discovered and/or signed players such as Don Cardwell, Jimmie Coker, and Dickie Noles.

He also owned and operated Carolinas Men's Shop and, later, the Livengood Furniture Company.  He died at age 86 and is buried at Salem Cemetery in Winston-Salem.

References

External links

1910 births
1996 deaths
Baseball player-managers
Baseball players from North Carolina
Bassett Furnituremakers players
Cincinnati Reds players
Durham Bulls players
Greensboro Patriots players
Greenville Bucks players
High Point Pointers players
Kinston Eagles players
Lexington Indians players
Little Rock Travelers players
Major League Baseball pitchers
Milwaukee Brewers (minor league) players
Minor league baseball managers
People from Salisbury, North Carolina
Philadelphia Phillies scouts
Portsmouth Cubs players
Raleigh Capitals players
Sumter Chicks players
Thomasville Chair Makers players
United States Navy personnel of World War II
Winston-Salem Twins players